Fleet Air Reconnaissance Squadron 5 (VQ-5) was a former squadron of the U.S. Navy that was established on August 15, 1991. During its short-lived career, it was one of two squadrons assigned in the U.S. Navy to operate the ES-3A Shadow, which was a specialised version of the S-3 Viking used for over-horizon tracking and electronic intelligence.

History

Early years 
In 1991, with the retirement of the EA-3B Skywarrior after 40 years of flying the US Navy, the Navy prepared for the delivery of their new ES-3As. Before this, VQ-5 was established on August 15 of that year at NAS Agana, Guam, receiving their first 2 S-3A Vikings for pilot and crew training on 10 November 1991. On May 8, 1992, the first ES-3A was delivered to VQ-5, with ES-3A's VQ-5 Det.

Detachments to carrier air wings 
Starting in 1994, VQ-5 operated in detachments were deployed to numerous carrier air wings. As part of a 7th Fleet directive that year, it assigned a two-plane permanently attached detachment (VQ-5 Detachment 5) to Carrier Air Wing 5 based in Japan with the Independence. Unlike CVW-5 which was based at NAF Atsugi, VQ-5 Det. 5 was based in NAF Misawa. During that same year, they participated in operations in the Western Pacific during the tensions in the Korean Peninsula. VQ-5 also deployed to CVW-15 on board the  during 1994 before their disestablishment in 1995.

In 1995, with the impending closure of NAS Agana in Guam, the Sea Shadows moved to NAS North Island in San Diego. During the 1996 Taiwan Strait Crisis, VQ-5 was deployed on two carriers in the region, the USS Nimitz as well as the USS Independence.

Final cruise and retirement 
In 1998, VQ-5 made their last cruise ever as Detachment C deployed with the Carl Vinson and CVW-11 during Operation Desert Fox before returning in May 1999. VQ-5 never deployed again and remained back in North Island. In June 1999, a ceremony was held for the decommissioning of the squadron although they were officially inactivated on July 31, 1999.

References 

Fleet air reconnaissance squadrons of the United States Navy
Military units and formations established in 1991
Military units and formations disestablished in 1999